Matthew Lodge (born 31 May 1995) is a rugby league footballer who plays as a  for the Sydney Roosters in the NRL.  

He previously played for the Wests Tigers, Brisbane Broncos and New Zealand Warriors in the National Rugby League.

Background
Lodge was born in Sydney, New South Wales, Australia.

He played his junior rugby league for St. Patricks Blacktown before being signed by the Penrith Panthers.

Playing career

Early career
He played for Penrith's NYC team in 2012.

In September 2012, Lodge signed a contract with the Melbourne Storm starting in 2013. He played for the Storm's NYC team in 2013 and 2014.

Wests Tigers
In June 2014, Lodge joined the Wests Tigers mid-season for the remainder of the season, joining their NYC squad. In Round 17 of the 2014 NRL season, Lodge made his NRL debut for the Tigers against his former team, the Penrith Panthers. He made four first grade appearances for the year. He was described as a "110kg battering ram," who was "certain to feature in the regular squad next season." Later in the year, he was chosen to participate in the NSW under-20s pathway camp.

On 19 October 2015, Lodge was sacked by the Tigers after being arrested in New York City. He was due back in court for sentencing in December after entering a guilty plea.

Brisbane Broncos
After spending some time with the Redcliffe Dolphins in the Queensland Cup, Lodge signed a 1-year contract with the Brisbane Broncos starting in 2018.

Lodge made 22 appearances for Brisbane in the 2019 NRL season as the club finished 8th on the table and qualified for the finals.  Lodge played in the club's elimination final against Parramatta which Brisbane lost 58-0 at the new Western Sydney Stadium.  The defeat was the worst in Brisbane's history and also the biggest finals defeat in history.

On 19 February 2020, Lodge suffered an ACL injury during pre-season training for Brisbane and was ruled out for an extended period.

Lodge only featured in six games for Brisbane in the 2020 NRL season as the club finished last on the table.

New Zealand Warriors
Lodge agreed a midseason switch from Brisbane to the Warriors during the 2021 NRL season.
In the final round of the 2021 NRL season, Lodge was sent to the sin bin for a dangerous high tackle in the club's 44-0 loss against the Gold Coast.
In May 2022, Lodge was released from his New Zealand contract with immediate effect.  Lodge was then paid out the remaining $700,000 of his contract in full by the club.

Sydney Roosters
Following his abrupt departure from the New Zealand Warriors, Lodge was signed to a short-term contract by the Sydney Roosters, joining the club in July 2022.
Following the clubs opening round loss of the 2023 NRL season, it was revealed that Lodge would be ruled out for an extended period after suffering a facial fracture.

Representative career
Lodge has played for the Australian Schoolboys.

In 2011, Lodge played for both the New South Wales Under 16s and Under 18s teams.

In 2013 and 2014, Lodge played for the New South Wales Under 20s team. Lodge was representing the NSW under-20s side when he was given a 3-week suspension after he was televised with the word "CUNT" clearly written on his wrist strapping.

On 2 May 2015, Lodge played for the Junior Kangaroos against Junior Kiwis.

Assault charge and lawsuit in New York and NRL controversy
On 16 October 2015, Lodge was arrested and charged with assault after he threatened two German tourists, chased them into a New York apartment building, and attacked a man who attempted to help. He proceeded to break into and smash furniture in the man's apartment, including punching a wall through the bathroom door where a nine-year-old boy was hiding, before being stopped by police. He was initially charged with felony burglary causing injury, but it was reduced to a misdemeanor charge of reckless assault as part of a plea deal. The victims then filed a civil lawsuit against Lodge for US$2 million in July 2016. In December 2016, Lodge avoided jail time, and was ordered to complete 200 hours of community service, quit drinking, and receive alcohol abuse and anger treatment. Lodge signed a 1-year contract worth an estimated AU$85,000 with Brisbane Broncos for the 2018 National Rugby League season. The NRL were scrutinised for supporting Lodge and allowing the deal to happen while the victims have not been legally compensated.

References

External links

Brisbane Broncos profile
Wests Tigers profile

1995 births
Living people
Australian rugby league players
Brisbane Broncos players
Sydney Roosters players
New Zealand Warriors players
Redcliffe Dolphins players
Junior Kangaroos players
Rugby league props
Rugby league players from Sydney
Wests Tigers players